The Football Factory is the title of the following works:

 The Football Factory (film)
 The Football Factory (novel)